Beaupréau-en-Mauges is a commune in the Maine-et-Loire department in western France.

It was established on 15 December 2015 by the merger of the former communes of Andrezé, Beaupréau, La Chapelle-du-Genêt, Gesté, Jallais, La Jubaudière, Le Pin-en-Mauges, La Poitevinière, Saint-Philbert-en-Mauges and Villedieu-la-Blouère. Beaupréau is the municipal seat.

Population

See also
Communes of the Maine-et-Loire department

References

Communes of Maine-et-Loire
States and territories established in 2015
Anjou